The Sui Southern Gas Company (SSGC), formerly known as Sui Gas Transmission Company Limited, is a Pakistani natural gas supply company based in Karachi, Pakistan.

History 
It was formed in 1955. The company in its present shape was formed on March 30, 1989, following a series of mergers of three pioneering companies, namely Sui Gas Transmission Company Limited, Karachi Gas Company Limited and Indus Gas Company Limited.

Sui Southern Gas Company is Pakistan's leading integrated gas company. The company is engaged in the business of transmission and distribution of natural gas in southern part of Pakistan- mainly in Sindh and Baluchistan. Sui Southern Gas Company transmission system extends from Sui, Balochistan to Karachi, Sindh.

The company also owns and operates the only gas meter manufacturing plant in the country, under an agreement with Schlumberger Industries, France. The Company is listed on the Pakistan Stock Exchange. On 11 January 2016, all 3 local city stock exchanges merged to form Pakistan Stock Exchange.

Gas Shortfall 

See also

 Sui gas field
 Sui Northern Gas Pipelines Limited
 Sui Southern Gas Company cricket team
KSE 100 Index

References

External links
 Sui Southern Gas Company Official Website

Oil and gas companies of Pakistan
Natural gas companies
Natural gas pipeline companies
Companies based in Karachi
Energy companies established in 1955
Non-renewable resource companies established in 1955
1955 establishments in Pakistan
Energy companies established in 1989
Non-renewable resource companies established in 1989
Companies listed on the Pakistan Stock Exchange
Pakistani companies established in 1989